Théodore Simon (10 July 1873 – 4 September 1961) was a French psychologist who worked with Alfred Binet to develop the Binet-Simon scale, one of the most widely used scales in the world for measuring intelligence. This scale was revised in 1908 and 1911, and served as a template for the development of newer scales. Simon worked at various hospitals throughout France, including Sainte-Anne and Dury-les-Amiens. He also worked as the head psychiatrist at Saint-Yon hospital and as a medical director at Perray-Vaucluse. He was also the founder of the first nursing school in psychiatry at the Maison Blanche hospital in Neuilly-sur-Marne, in 1946. The training institute which continues to this day bears his name.

Biography

Education and early career

Théodore Simon was born on 10 July 1873 in Dijon, France. Simon's father worked as a railroad engineer for PLM. His early life was filled with great loss of family members. After becoming orphaned, Simon lived with his uncle in Sens. Simon's older brother also died at the young age of 23. During much of his early life, he was fascinated by Alfred Binet's work and constantly read his books. Simon was a medical doctor and was interested in questions of both philosophy and psychology. His interest in psychology continually increased, especially as the need for clinical experience in the field decreased.

In 1899, Simon was appointed as an intern at the asylum at Perray-Vaucluse where he began his famous work on abnormal children. This drew Binet's attention, who was at the time studying the correlation between physical growth and intellectual development. Binet came to the asylum and continued his work there with Simon. This research led to Simon's medical thesis on the topic in 1900.

From 1901-1905, Simon worked in various hospitals, from Sainte-Anne to Dury-les-Amiens. In March 1903, Simon worked with Binet in the Free Society for the Psychological Study of Children, which was dedicated to the discussion and the creation of a plan to aid in identifying and improving the education of abnormal children. This sparked Binet and Simon's work on establishing a scale to identify abnormal children. Simon and Binet released the Binet-Simon Intelligence Scale to the public for the first time in 1905. The Binet-Simon Intelligence Scale would become the most widely used device for measuring a person's intelligence. The Binet-Simon Intelligence Scale premiered in L'Année psychologique a journal founded by Binet in 1895.

Late career

Simon was critical of the immoderate and improper use of the Binet-Simon Intelligence Scale by other psychologists and professionals due to his belief that the scale was being over-used, which may have been inappropriate, preventing psychologists from achieving Binet's ultimate goal of understanding human beings, their nature, and their development. The Binet-Simon Intelligence Scale was revised in 1908 and again in 1911. Simon kept the scale the same after Binet's death as a sign of respect for one of history's greatest psychologists and Simon's true idol.

After 1905 until 1920, Simon worked as the head psychiatrist at Saint-Yon hospital in Essonne department in Île-de-France (northern France). In 1920, he returned as medical director at Perray-Vaucluse until 1930. From there, he moved to act as medical director until late 1936, when he retired. Starting in 1912, Simon was also a long-time president and editor for Bulletin of Société Alfred Binet. In 1946 Simon established the first specialized nursing school. Originally the Ecole des Bleues, and later renamed L'Ecole d'Infirmières de Maison-Blanche, it is now the Institut de Formation Interhospitalier Theodore Simon. He served as the technical director for 11 years (1946–1957).

Simon died in 1961.

Publications
Binet, A., & Simon, Th. (1905a). New methods for diagnosing the idiot, the imbecile, and the moron. In Sante de Sanctis (Ed.), Atti del V congresso internazionale di psicologia tenuto in Roma dal 26 al 30 aprile 1905 sotto la presidenza del Prof Giuseppe Sergi (pp. 507–510). Rome, Italy: Forzani.

References

External links
 
 

French psychiatrists
1872 births
1961 deaths
Intelligence researchers
Physicians from Dijon